TNFC may refer to:

 Team Northumbria F.C.
 The Natural Fibre Company
 Thurnby Nirvana F.C.
 Trans National Finance Company
 Thursday Night Fight Club